Tingena berenice is a species of moth in the family Oecophoridae. It is endemic to New Zealand and has been found in the North and South Islands. It is a brightly coloured species which is on the wing in November. Its preferred habitat is mixed beech forest.

Taxonomy 
This species was described by Edward Meyrick in 1929 using specimens collected by George Hudson in November in Wellington and named Borkhausenia berenice. In 1988 J. S. Dugdale placed this species in the genus Tingena. The female holotype specimen is held at the Natural History Museum, London.

Description 

Meyrick described the adults of this species as follows:
This species is brightly coloured.

Distribution 
This species is endemic to New Zealand. It was first collected by Hudson in Gollans Valley and has also been found near the Homer Tunnel.

Behaviour 
Adults of this species are on the wing in November.

Habitat 
This species preferred habitat is mixed beech forest.

References

Oecophoridae
Moths of New Zealand
Moths described in 1929
Endemic fauna of New Zealand
Taxa named by Edward Meyrick
Endemic moths of New Zealand